This article is about the particular significance of the year 1726 to Wales and its people.

Incumbents
Lord Lieutenant of North Wales (Lord Lieutenant of Anglesey, Caernarvonshire, Denbighshire, Flintshire, Merionethshire, Montgomeryshire) – George Cholmondeley, 2nd Earl of Cholmondeley 
Lord Lieutenant of Glamorgan – vacant until 1729
Lord Lieutenant of Brecknockshire and Lord Lieutenant of Monmouthshire – Sir William Morgan of Tredegar
Lord Lieutenant of Cardiganshire – John Vaughan, 2nd Viscount Lisburne
Lord Lieutenant of Carmarthenshire – vacant until 1755 
Lord Lieutenant of Pembrokeshire – Sir Arthur Owen, 3rd Baronet
Lord Lieutenant of Radnorshire – James Brydges, 1st Duke of Chandos

Bishop of Bangor – William Baker
Bishop of Llandaff – Robert Clavering  
Bishop of St Asaph – John Wynne
Bishop of St Davids – Richard Smalbroke

Events
11 January - Thomas Lloyd of Halton becomes High Sheriff of Flintshire.
26 July - Prince Frederick, son of the Prince of Wales, is created Baron Snowdon by his grandfather, King George I of Great Britain.
November - John Verney is appointed a judge in Wales by prime minister Robert Walpole, after switching his political allegiance.
26 November - New county sheriffs are appointed: 
Broughton Whitehall of Broughton (Flintshire).
Thomas Rowland of Cayrey (Anglesey).
Richard Wellington of Hay Castle (Brecknockshire).
Humphrey Roberts, Brynneuadd, (Caernarvonshire).
David Lewis of Gernos (Cardiganshire).
John Lloyd of Danyrallt (Carmarthenshire).
Edward Salusbury of Galltfaenan (Denbighshire).
Morgan Morgan of Llanrumney (Glamorgan).
Athelstan Owen of Rhiwaedog (Merionethshire/Montgomeryshire).
Richard Lewis of Court-y-Gallon (Monmouthshire).
David Lewis, of Vogart or Llandewi (Pembrokeshire).
Edward Burton of Vronlas (Radnorshire).
date unknown
Poet Anna Williams and her father Zachariah move into the London Charterhouse, London, while he experiments in using magnetism in pursuit of the longitude prize.
Road bridges built
Pont Fadog, Dyffryn Ardudwy.
Teifi bridge, Cardigan.

Arts and literature

New books
John Dyer - Grongar Hill (included in Richard Savage’s Miscellaneous Poems and Translations by Several Hands) 
Moses Williams (ed.) - Repertorium Poeticum

Births
14 June - Thomas Pennant, traveller and writer (died 1798)
30 July - William Jones of Nayland, clergyman and author (died 1800)
June - William Jones, poet, antiquary and radical (died 1795)
date unknown 
Sarah Gwynne (daughter of Marmaduke Gwynne), future wife of Charles Wesley (died 1822)
Richard Myddelton, politician (died 1795)
probable - Edward Edwards, clergyman and academic (died 1783)

Deaths
25 January - Rowland Gwynne, politician, 67
3 October - Edward Stradling, politician, 27 
date unknown - Thomas Williams, clergyman and translator, 68

References

1720s in Wales
Years of the 18th century in Wales